Sosnovskoye Rural Settlement is an administrative and municipal division (a rural settlement) of Priozersky District of Leningrad Oblast, Russia. Its administrative center is the rural locality (a selo) of Sosnovo. Population: 10,830 (2010 Census);

References

Notes

Rural settlements of Russia

